Foucault is a book by José Guilherme Merquior about the French philosopher Michel Foucault, first published in 1985.

Overview 
Merquior's assessment of Foucault's work is largely negative; he argues that Foucault's work is marked by factual errors and questionable arguments. Merquior acknowledges that Foucault "forced us to think anew on sundry past forms of knowledge" in relation to themes of madness, punishment and sexuality, but characterises him as a "doctrinaire historian who more often than not strives to compress the historical record in the Procust's [sic] bed of ideological preinterpretations." Concluding, Merquior characterises Foucault as "a neo-anarchist".

Reception 
In his foreword to Gilles Deleuze's Foucault, Paul Bové described Merquior's book as "a particularly sad example of uncritical arrogance that embarasses everyone involved". John M. Ellis, however, identified the book as "the best general account of Foucault", while  Alan Swingewood, reviewing the book in The British Journal of Sociology, described it as "an elegant and well-informed of Foucault's 'highly original' fusion of history and philosophy". Camille Paglia wrote that Merquior's study "hilariously exposes the elementary errors made by Foucault in every area he wrote about".

Notes

References 
 
 
 
 
 

1985 non-fiction books
Biographies about philosophers
Books about Michel Foucault
Books by José Guilherme Merquior
Contemporary philosophical literature
English-language books
English non-fiction books